Nothosaurs (order Nothosauroidea) were Triassic marine sauropterygian reptiles. The feet were paddle-like, and are known to have been webbed in life, to help power the animal when swimming. The neck was quite long, and the head was elongated and flattened, and relatively small in relation to the body. The margins of the long jaws were equipped with numerous sharp outward-pointing teeth, indicating a diet of fish and squid.

Taxonomy
The Nothosauroidea consist of two suborders:
 Pachypleurosauria, small primitive forms, and
 Nothosauria (including two families Nothosauridae and Simosauridae), which evolved from pachypleurosaurs.

The placement of pachypleurosaurs within Nothosauroidea is uncertain, as several analyses recover it as basal to Eusauropterygia, e.i. the clade formed by Nothosauria and Pistosauroidea, instead as the sister taxon of Nothosauria. However, most analyses still reinforce the traditional hypothesis of the sister taxon relationship between Pachypleurosauria and Nothosauria.

Nothosaur-like reptiles were in turn ancestral to the more completely marine plesiosaurs, which replaced them at the end of the Triassic period.

References

Sources
 
 Benton, M. J. (2004), Vertebrate Paleontology, 3rd ed. Blackwell Science Ltd classification
 Colbert, E. H., (1969), Evolution of the Vertebrates, John Wiley & Sons Inc (2nd ed.)
 Rieppel, O., (2000), Sauropterygia I, placodontia, pachypleurosauria, nothosauroidea, pistosauroidea: In: Handbuch der Palaoherpetologie, part 12A, 134pp. Verlag Dr. Friedrich Pfeil Table of contents

 
Triassic sauropterygians
Taxa named by Georg Baur